The Caribbean Socialist Party was a political party in Trinidad and Tobago. Led by Patrick Solomon, it contested the 1950 general elections together with the Butler Party, receiving 2.4% of the vote and winning a single seat, taken by A. P. T. James. It did not contest any further elections.

References

Defunct political parties in Trinidad and Tobago